The 2010 ECAC Hockey Men's Ice Hockey Tournament was the 49th tournament in league history. It was played between March 5 and March 20, 2010. First Round and Quarterfinal games were played at home team campus sites, while the final four games were played at the Times Union Center in Albany, New York. By winning the tournament, Cornell received the ECAC Hockey automatic bid to the 2010 NCAA Division I Men's Ice Hockey Tournament.

In the Quarterfinals series between Union and Quinnipiac the first match became the longest game played in NCAA history when the winning goal was scored in the 151st minute of play (the fifth overtime).

Format
The tournament features four rounds of play. In the first round, the fifth and twelfth, sixth and eleventh, seventh and tenth, and eighth and ninth seeds as determined by the final regular season standings play a best-of-three series, with the winner advancing to the quarterfinals. There, the first seed and lowest ranked first round winner, the second seed and second lowest ranked first round winner, the third seed and second highest ranked first round winner, and the fourth seed and highest ranked first round winner play a best-of-three series, with the winner advancing to the semifinals. In the semifinals, the highest and lowest seeds and second highest and second lowest seeds play a single-game, with the winner advancing to the championship game and the loser advancing to the third place game. The tournament champion receives an automatic bid to the 2010 NCAA Men's Division I Ice Hockey Tournament.

Regular season standings
Note: GP = Games played; W = Wins; L = Losses; T = Ties; PTS = Points; GF = Goals For; GA = Goals Against

Bracket
Teams are reseeded after the First Round and Quarterfinals

Note: * denotes overtime period(s)

First round

(5) St. Lawrence vs. (12) Clarkson

(6) Rensselaer vs. (11) Brown

(7) Quinnipiac vs. (10) Dartmouth

(8) Princeton vs. (9) Harvard

Quarterfinals

(1) Yale vs. (11) Brown

(2) Cornell vs. (9) Harvard

(3) Union vs. (7) Quinnipiac

(4) Colgate vs. (5) St. Lawrence

Semifinals

(2) Cornell vs. (11) Brown

(3) Union vs. (5) St. Lawrence

Third place

(5) St. Lawrence vs. (8) Brown

Championship

(2) Cornell vs. (3) Union

Tournament awards

All-Tournament Team
F Colin Greening (Cornell)
F Riley Nash (Cornell)
F Adam Presiznuk (Union)
D Justin Krueger (Cornell)
D Mike Schreiber (Union)
G Ben Scrivens* (Cornell)
* Most Outstanding Player(s)

References

External links
2010 ECAC Hockey Men's Ice Hockey Tournament

Ecac Tournament
ECAC Hockey Men's Ice Hockey Tournament